Jeff Shulman (born February 18, 1975) is the editor of Card Player Magazine, and an American poker player with a record of success in tournament play, based in Las Vegas, Nevada. He is the son of Jan Shulman and Barry Shulman.  Shulman's father, Barry, is an accomplished poker player and CEO of Card Player.

Life and career

Shulman was born in Seattle, Washington and attended the University of Washington.

He finished 7th in the 2000 World Series of Poker (WSOP) $10,000 no limit Texas hold'em main event, winning $146,700 after losing two big pots to eventual winner Chris Ferguson. He also finished in the money in the same event in 2003 (31st place) and 2009 (5th).

Shulman has cashed in several other WSOP and World Poker Tour (WPT) events. He also won a tournament in the Ultimate Poker Challenge's first season, and made the final table of that season's grand final, won by James Van Alstyne.

In 2006, Shulman appeared on Poker Superstars III finishing in the Elite Eight.

Shulman was a member of the 2009 November Nine. Since Harrah's Casino has partnered with Cardplayer Magazines competitor, Bluff Magazine, Shulman is reported to loathe Harrah's Casino.  He reportedly said that if he were to win the WSOP Main Event, he would throw away the bracelet.  An article on the Cardplayer website indicates that Shulman's disdain for Harrah's Casino does not stem from their partnership with Bluff Magazine:

My comments have nothing to do with that, and everything to do with my disappointment in how the World Series is run. It used to be run by people who loved and really cared about poker, and had the players in mind, first and foremost.  That mission's been derailed by a few executives who now head the Series.

After qualifying for the 2009 WSOP Main Event final table, Shulman hired Phil Hellmuth as his poker coach.  At the final table, Shulman was eliminated in fifth place, cashing for just under $2 million, which is his highest tournament cash to date.

As of January 2010, Shulman's total live tournament winnings total $3,257,467.

Shulman has one brother, Michael Shulman, an American writer and owner of the online magazine ShulmanSays.  Shulman is married to Christy Devine. They have two children.

Notes

External links
CardPlayer.com
Card-Sharx profile
Hendon Mob tournament results
Shulman discusses being Jewish

1975 births
American gambling writers
American male non-fiction writers
American magazine editors
American poker players
Jewish American writers
Living people
Writers from Seattle
University of Washington alumni
21st-century American Jews